West Coast sound may refer to:

Yacht rock
California sound
West coast country